Peleserphidae is an extinct family of wasps belonging to the superfamily Proctotrupoidea. It is currently known from four species in three genera. One (Arkadiserphus) from the Middle-Late Jurassic Karabastau Formation of Kazakhstan, and the others (Peleserphus and Peleproctus) from mid Cretaceous Burmese amber from Myanmar.

References 

Prehistoric insect families
Prehistoric hymenoptera
Proctotrupoidea